Chow Ting Yu, known professionally as Marvel Chow, is a retired professional wushu taolu athlete and actor from Hong Kong.

Career

Wushu 
In his youth, Chow wanted to pursue a career in badminton and decided to learn wushu on the side to help him improve on his main sport. Unexpectedly, he chose instead to pursue wushu and joined the Hong Kong Wushu team in 1992.

Chow made his international debut at the 1999 World Wushu Championships where he became the world champion in qiangshu and also won a bronze medal in jianshu. Two years later at the 2001 World Wushu Championships, he was a double silver medalist in jianshu and qiangshu. His last competition was at the 2003 World Wushu Championships where he was once again the world champion in qiangshu and a silver medalist in the inaugural rendition of duilian.

Acting 
After retiring from competitive wushu, Chow started practicing wing chun which eventually led to his acting roles starting with Ip Man in 2008.

Filmography 

 Ip Man (2008)
 Ip Man: The Final Fight (2013)
 Golden Brother (2014)

Awards 
Awards from the Junior Chamber International Hong Kong

 : 2011

References

External links 

 
 

Living people
Hong Kong wushu practitioners
Wushu practitioners at the 1998 Asian Games
1978 births